The Central Board of Film Certification (CBFC) is a statutory film-certification body in the Ministry of Information and Broadcasting of the Government of India. It is tasked with "regulating the public exhibition of films under the provisions of the Cinematograph Act 1952." The Cinematograph Act 1952 outlines a strict certification process for commercial films shown in public venues. Films screened in cinemas and on television may only be publicly exhibited in India after certification by the board and edited.

Certificates and guidelines 

The board currently issues four certificates. Originally, there were two: U (unrestricted public exhibition with family-friendly movies) and A (restricted to adult audiences but any kind of Nudity not allowed). Two more were added in June U/A (unrestricted public exhibition, with parental guidance for children under 12) and S (restricted to specialised audiences, such as Doctors or Scientists). The board may refuse to certify a film. Additionally, V/U, V/UA, V/A are used for video releases with U, U/A and A carrying the same meaning as above.

U certificate 
Films with the U certification are fit for unrestricted public exhibition and are family-friendly. These films can contain universal themes like education, family, drama, romance, sci-fi, action etc. Now, these films can also contain some mild violence, but it should not be prolonged. It may also contain very mild sexual scenes (without any traces of nudity or sexual detail).

U/A certificate 
Films with the U/A certification can contain moderate adult themes, that is not strong in nature and can be watched by a child below 12 years of age under parental guidance. These films contain moderate to strong violence, moderate sexual scenes (traces of nudity and moderate sexual detail can be found), frightening scenes or muted abusive language.

A certificate 
Films with the A certification are available for public exhibition, but with restriction to adults (aged 18+). These films can contain violence, sexual scenes, abusive language, but words which insult or degrade women or any social group and nudity are not allowed. Some controversial and adult themes are considered unsuitable for young viewers. Such films are often re-certified with V/U and V/UA for TV and video viewing, which doesn't happen in case of U and U/A certified movies.

S certificate 
Films with S certification should not be viewed by the public. Only people associated with it (Engineers, Doctors, Scientists, etc.), have permission to watch those films.

History 
The Indian Cinematograph Act came into effect in 1920, seven years after the production of India's first film: Dadasaheb Phalke's Raja Harishchandra. Censorship boards were originally independent bodies under the police chiefs of the cities of Madras (now Chennai), Bombay (now Mumbai), Calcutta (now Kolkata), Lahore (now in Pakistan), and Rangoon (now Yangon in Myanmar).

After the 1947 independence of India, autonomous regional censors were absorbed into the Bombay Board of Film Censors. The Cinematograph Act of 1952 reorganised the Bombay board into the Central Board of Film Censors. With the 1983 revision of cinematography rules, the body was renamed the Central Board of Film Certification.

In 2021 the Film Certification Appellate Tribunal (FCAT) was scrapped by the Indian government.

Principles 
The board's guiding principles are to ensure healthy public entertainment and education and, using modern technology, to make the certification process and board activities transparent to filmmakers, the media and the public also every video have to undergo CBFC certification for telecasting or distributing over any platform in India and suggestible same standards for anywhere in the world.

Refusal to certify 
In addition to the certifications above, there is also the possibility of the board refusing to certify the film at all.

The board's guidelines are:
 Anti-social activities (such as violence) may not be glorified
 Criminal acts may not be depicted
 The following is prohibited:
a) Involvement of children in violent acts or abuse
b) Abuse or ridicule of the physically or mentally handicapped
c) Unnecessary depictions of cruelty to animals
 Gratuitous violence, cruelty, or horror
 No scenes encouraging alcohol consumption, drug addiction or smoking
 No vulgarity, obscenity, depravity, double entendres or scenes degrading women, including sexual violence (as much as possible)
 No denigration by race, religion or other social group
 No promotion of sectarian, obscurantist, anti-scientific and anti-national attitudes
 Relations with foreign countries should not be affected.
 No national symbols or emblems, except in accordance with the Emblems and Names (Prevention of Improper Use) Act, 1950 (12 of 1950)

Enforcement 
Since 2004, censorship has been rigorously enforced. An incident was reported in which exhibitor staff – a clerk who sold the ticket, the usher who allowed minors to sit, a theatre manager and the partners of the theatre complex – were arrested for non-compliance with certification rules.

Composition and leadership 
The board consists of a chairperson and 23 members, all of whom are appointed by the central government. Prasoon Joshi chairs the board; Joshi became its 28th chairperson on 11 August 2017, after Pahlaj Nihalani was fired. Nihalani had succeeded Leela Samson after Samson quit in protest of an appellate tribunal's overturning of a board decision to refuse certification for MSG: The Messenger. Samson had succeeded Sharmila Tagore.

The board, headquartered in Mumbai, has nine regional offices:

 Trivandrum
 Chennai
 Hyderabad
 Bangalore
 Mumbai
 Cuttack
 Guwahati
 Kolkata
 New Delhi

Controversies 
The board has been associated with a number of scandals. Film producers reportedly bribe the CBFC to obtain a UA certificate, which entitles them to a 30-percent reduction in entertainment tax.

In 2002, War and Peace (a documentary film by Anand Patwardhan which depicted nuclear weapons testing and the September 11 attacks) was edited 21 times before the film was approved for release. According to Patwardhan, "The cuts that [the Board] asked for are so ridiculous that they won't hold up in court. But if these cuts do make it, it will be the end of freedom of expression in the Indian media." A court ruled that the cut requirement was unconstitutional, and the film was shown uncensored.

That year, Indian filmmaker and CBFC chair Vijay Anand proposed legalising the exhibition of X-rated films in selected cinemas. Anand said, "Porn is shown everywhere in India clandestinely ... and the best way to fight this onslaught of blue movies is to show them openly in theatres with legally authorised licences". Anand resigned less than a year after becoming chairperson in the wake of his proposal.

The board refused to certify Gulabi Aaina (a film about Indian transsexuals produced and directed by Sridhar Rangayan) in 2003; Rangayan unsuccessfully appealed the decision twice. Although the film is banned in India, it has been screened in the UK.

Final Solution, a 2004 documentary examining religious riots between Hindus and Muslims in Gujarat which killed over 1,000 people, was also banned. According to the board, the film was "highly provocative and may trigger off unrest and communal violence". After a sustained campaign, the ban was lifted in October of that year.

The CBFC demanded five cuts from the 2011 American film, The Girl with the Dragon Tattoo, because of nudity and rape scenes. The producers and the director, David Fincher, eventually decided not to release the film in India.

CEO Rakesh Kumar was arrested in August 2014 for accepting bribes to expedite the issuance of certificates. The board demanded four cuts (three visual and one audio) from the 2015 Malayalam film, Chaayam Poosiya Veedu) (directed by brothers Santosh Babusenan and Satish Babusenan), because of nude scenes. The directors refused to make the changes, and the film was not certified.

CBFC chair Leela Samson resigned in protest of political interference in the board's work in 2015 after its decision to refuse certification of the film, MSG: The Messenger, was overturned by an appellate tribunal. Samson was replaced by Pahlaj Nihalani, whose Bharatiya Janata Party affiliation triggered a wave of additional board resignations. The board was criticised for ordering the screen time of two kissing scenes in the James Bond film Spectre (2015) to be cut by half for release.

Udta Punjab (2016), co-produced by Anurag Kashyap and Ekta Kapoor, inspired a list of 94 cuts and 13 pointers (including an order to remove Punjabi city names). The film was approved for release with one cut and disclaimers by the Bombay High Court.  A copy of the film was leaked online, with evidence indicating possible CBFC involvement. Kashyap posted on Facebook that although he did not object to free downloads, he hoped that viewers would pay for the film. In August 2017, days after his removal as CBFC chair, Nihalani said in an interview that he had received instructions from the Ministry of Information and Broadcasting to block the release of this film and at least one other.

Lipstick Under My Burkha (2017), directed by Alankrita Shrivastava and produced by Prakash Jha, was originally denied certification. The film, which had been screened at international film festivals, was eligible for the Golden Globe Awards. The filmmakers appealed to the board's Film Certification Appellate Tribunal (FCAT), which authorised its release. The FCAT requested some cuts (primarily to sex scenes), and the film was released with an A certificate. Shrivastava said, "Of course I would have loved no cuts, but the FCAT has been very fair and clear. I feel that we will be able to release the film without hampering the narrative or diluting its essence."

References

External links 
 

1952 establishments in Bombay State
Censorship in India
Certification marks
Film censorship in India
Film controversies in India
Film organisations in India
Ministry of Information and Broadcasting (India)
Motion picture rating systems
Government agencies established in 1952
Entertainment rating organizations